Senator Goddard may refer to:

Charles Backus Goddard (1796–1864), Ohio State Senate
Charles Goddard (politician) (1825–1889), Maine State Senate
Dan Goddard (born 1947), Kansas State Senate
Robert Hale Ives Goddard (1837–1916), Rhode Island State Senate
O. F. Goddard (1853–1943), Montana State Senate

See also
Abel Godard (1835–1891), New York